Gregory Schopen is Professor of Buddhist Studies at University of California, Los Angeles. He received his B.A. majoring in American literature from Black Hills State College, M.A. in history of religions from McMaster University in Ontario, Canada, and Ph.D. in South Asian and Buddhist studies from the Australian National University in Canberra. His Ph.D thesis is titled "Bhaisajyaguru-sutra and the Buddhism of Gilgit."

Awards
 1985 MacArthur Fellows Program

Works
Bones, stones, and Buddhist monks: collected papers on the archaeology, epigraphy, and texts of monastic Buddhism in India, University of Hawaii Press, 1997, 
Buddhist monks and business matters: still more papers on monastic Buddhism in India, University of Hawaii Press, 2004, 
Figments and fragments of Mahāyāna Buddhism in India: more collected papers, University of Hawaii Press, 2005, 
Buddhist Nuns, Monks, and Other Worldly Matters: Recent Papers on Monastic Buddhism in India, University of Hawaii Press, 2014,

References

External links
The Buddha as a Businessman 

Living people
Brown University faculty
University of California, Los Angeles faculty
MacArthur Fellows
People from South Dakota
Epigraphers
American Buddhist studies scholars
American Buddhists
Year of birth missing (living people)